Haldon Forest is a forest located in the Haldon Hills, Devon, England. The forest consists of several different woods. Geographically, Haldon Forest is located between the towns of Chudleigh and Exminster and is south of Exeter.

Management
It is managed by the Forestry Commission, who also manage other forests throughout the country.

Activities
The Forestry Commission promotes many activities at the park, such as cycling, horse riding, walking, orienteering, and others. There is a selection of walking and cycling trails to suit all abilities.

The park also holds regular events.

Also based at Haldon Forest Park are:Go Ape, The Ridge Cafe, Forest Cycle Hire, Segway Southwest Ltd.

See also
Haldon Hills

External links
Forestry Commission

Forests and woodlands of Devon